Savitha Shri B (born 2007) is an Indian chess woman FIDE Master (2020) from the state of Tamil Nadu, India.

In the April 2021 FIDE ratings she was the highest-rated girl born in 2007 or later.

References 

Chess Woman International Masters
2007 births
Living people
Indian female chess players
Game players from Tamil Nadu
Sportspeople from Chennai